Selenoprotein O is a protein that in humans is encoded by the SELENOO gene.

Function

This gene encodes a selenoprotein that is localized to the mitochondria. It is the largest mammalian selenoprotein, containing the rare amino acid selenocysteine (Sec). Sec is encoded by the UGA codon, which normally signals translation termination. The 3' UTRs of selenoprotein mRNAs contain a conserved stem-loop structure, designated the Sec insertion sequence (SECIS) element, that is necessary for the recognition of UGA as a Sec codon, rather than as a stop signal. The exact function of this selenoprotein is not known, but it is thought to have redox activity. [provided by RefSeq, Dec 2016].

References

Further reading